The Malaysian Army Training and Doctrine Command (MyTRADOC, Jawi: ڤمرينتهن لاتيهن دان دوکترين تنترا دارت), known as PL&DTD and PLDTD, is a military command in charge of all Malaysian Army training centres, facilities and museum.

PLDTD is commanded by a major general

History 
PLDTD was established on 1 January 1994, which utilised the appointments of the XI Division Headquarters of Pasukan Simpanan Tentera Darat (PSTD, 'Army Reserve'). It was originally located at Imphal Camp, Kuala Lumpur. In the year 2010, PLDTD HQ was relocated to SiRusa Camp, Port Dickson and in the year 2014, it has once again moved to Segenting Camp, Port Dickson till today. The PLDTD organization has three main departments which are the Bahagian Pengurusan Am ('General Management Department'), the Bahagian Pengurusan Latihan ('Training Management Department') and the Bahagian Pembangunan Doktrin ('Doctrine Development Department').

Objective 
To increase the level of individual training quality based on the Malaysian Army training philosophy and developing/updating the Malaysian Army’s doctrine to allow the organisation to defend the nation as well as increasing the management of administrative and logistics matters.

Training Establishment under command 
Institut Pegawai Kanan Tentera Darat (INSPEKA, Army Senior Officers Institute)
Akademi Tentera Darat (ATD, Malaysian Army Academy)
Pusat Latihan Asas Tentera Darat (PUSASDA, Army Basic Training Centre)
Pusat Latihan Tempur Tentera Darat (PULADA, Army Combat Training Centre)
 Pusat Latihan Peperangan Khusus (PULPAK, Special Warfare Training Centre)
Pusat Latihan Muzik Tentera Darat (PUZIDA, Malaysian Army School of Music)
Pusat Latihan Askar Wataniah (PUSWATAN, Territorial Army Training Centre)
Pusat Latihan Armor (PULAMOR, Armoured Training Centre)
Institut Komunikasi Dan Elektronik Tentera Darat (IKED, Army Institute of Communications and Electronics)
Institut Kejuruteraan Medan Tentera Darat (IKEM, Army Field Engineering Institute)
Pusat Latihan Artileri (PUSARTI, Artillery Training Centre)
Pusat Latihan Kor Polis Tentera Diraja (PULAPOT, Royal Military Police Corps Training Centre)
Pusat Latihan Kor Perkhidmatan Diraja (PULMAT, Royal Service Corps Training Centre)
Pusat Latihan Kor Ordnans (PULNORD, Ordnance Corps Training Centre)
Institut Kejuruteraan Tentera Darat (IJED, Army Institute of Engineering)
Pusat Latihan Mekanis (PULAMEK, Mechanised Training Centre)
 Pasukan Latihan Pegawai Simpanan (PALAPES, Reserve Officers Training Unit — ROTU) – 17 Units

Commander

References

Formations of the Malaysian Army